Trichopsyllopus is a genus of mites in the family Acaridae.

Species
 Trichopsyllopus oregonensis Fain & G. T. Baker, 1983

References

Acaridae